Tampa Covenant Church is an Evangelical Presbyterian Church (EPC) in Lake Magdalene, Florida.  The building was designed by Alberto Alfonso and chosen by Arch Daily for a 2010 building of the year award in the religious category.

References

Churches in Tampa, Florida